Albu Nisi (also Romanized as Ālbū Nīsī) is a village in Elhayi Rural District, in the Central District of Ahvaz County, Khuzestan Province, Iran. At the 2006 census, its population was 673, in 96 families.

References 

Populated places in Ahvaz County